Petrotilapia genalutea is a species of cichlid endemic to Lake Malawi where it inhabits areas with rocky substrates from which it grazes algae. This species can reach a length  SL.  This species is also found in the aquarium trade.

References

External links 
 Photograph

genalutea
Fish of Lake Malawi
Fish of Malawi
Fish described in 1983
Taxonomy articles created by Polbot